Anadia petersi, known commonly as Peters' anadia, is a species of lizard in the family Gymnophthalmidae. The species is endemic to Ecuador.

Etymology
The specific name, petersi, is in honor of American herpetologist James A. Peters.

Geographic range
A. petersi is found in Loja Province, Ecuador.

Habitat

Reproduction
A. petersi is oviparous.

References

Further reading
Betancourt R, Reyes-Puig C, Lobos SE, Yánez-Muñoz MH, Torres-Carvajal O (2018). "Sistemática de los saurios Anadia Gray, 1845 (Sauria: Gymnophthalmidae) de Ecuador: límite de especies, distribución geográfica y descripción de una especie nueva". Neotropical Biodiversity 4 (1): 83–102. (in Spanish, with an abstract in English).
Oftedal OT (1974). "A revision of the genus Anadia (Sauria, Teiidae)". Arquivos de Zoologia, Museu de Zoologia da Universidade de São Paulo 25 (4): 203–265. (Anadia petersi, new species, pp. 226–229, Figures 10A, 10B, 11, 12, 13A).
Peters JA (1959). "Notas miscelaneas sobre saurios del Ecuador ". Ciencia y Naturaleza 2: 118–124. (in Spanish).

Anadia (genus)
Reptiles of Ecuador
Endemic fauna of Ecuador
Reptiles described in 1974
Taxa named by Olav T. Oftedal